A Tale of Two Cities is an 1859 novel by Charles Dickens.

A Tale of Two Cities may also refer to:

Adaptations of the novel 
 A Tale of Two Cities (1911 film), a silent film
 A Tale of Two Cities (1917 film), a silent American film directed by Frank Lloyd
 A Tale of Two Cities (1922 film), a silent film
 A Tale of Two Cities (1935 film), starring Ronald Colman
 A Tale of Two Cities (1935 play), a 1935 play by Terence Rattigan and John Gielgud
 A Tale of Two Cities (opera), a 1950 opera by Arthur Benjamin
 A Tale of Two Cities (1958 film), featuring Dirk Bogarde 
 A Tale of Two Cities (1965 TV series), featuring Patrick Troughton
 A Tale of Two Cities (1980 film), featuring Kenneth More
 A Tale of Two Cities (1980 TV series), featuring Paul Shelley
 A Tale of Two Cities (1989 TV series), featuring James Wilby
 A Tale of Two Cities (musical), a 2008 Broadway musical

Drama 
 Underbelly: A Tale of Two Cities, the second season of the Australian crime drama Underbelly
 "A Tale of Two Cities" (Lost), a 2006 episode of the TV series Lost
 "A Tale of Two Cities" (Mad Men), an episode of the TV series Mad Men
 A Tale of 2 Cities, a Singaporean Chinese drama by MediaCorp Channel 8

Other 
 "A Tale of Two Cities", the 1886 poem about Calcutta by Rudyard Kipling
 A Tale of Two Cities (1946 film), about the atomic bombings of Hiroshima and Nagasaki
 A Tale of Two Cities (album), the debut album by Mr Hudson & The Library
 A Tale of Two Cities (speech), a speech delivered by Mario Cuomo at the 1984 Democratic National Convention
 A Tale of Two Cities: The Circuit City Story
A Tale of 2 Citiez, a 2014 song by rapper J. Cole

See also
 Tales of Two Cities, a 2006 novel by George Fetherling